The Statue of Marshal Keith is a Category B listed monument on Broad Street in Peterhead, Scotland, dedicated to James Keith, a Scottish soldier and Generalfeldmarschall of the Royal Prussian Army. The statue, which stands in front of the Peterhead Town House and faces east (Keith's head is turned to the northeast), was presented by William I, German Emperor. It is a zinc replica of one made of marble that originally stood in Wilhelmplatz, Berlin, but is now in that city's Bode Museum.

See also
List of listed buildings in Peterhead, Aberdeenshire
Statue of Marshal Keith, Berlin

References

External links
STATUE OF FIELD MARSHALL KEITH – Historic Environment Scotland listing

Listed buildings in Peterhead
Tourist attractions in Peterhead
1868 sculptures
Category B listed buildings in Aberdeenshire
Listed monuments and memorials in Scotland
Outdoor sculptures in Scotland
Statues in Scotland
1868 establishments in Scotland
Zinc sculptures